The Greater Manchester Built-up Area is an area of land defined by the Office for National Statistics (ONS), consisting of the large conurbation that encompasses the urban element of the city of Manchester and the metropolitan area that forms much of Greater Manchester in North West England. According to the United Kingdom Census 2011, the Greater Manchester Built-up Area has a population of 2,553,379 making it the second most populous conurbation in the United Kingdom after the Greater London Built-up Area. This was an increase of 14% from the population recorded at the United Kingdom Census 2001 of 2,240,230, when it was known as the Greater Manchester Urban Area.

The Greater Manchester Built-up Area is not conterminous with Greater Manchester, a metropolitan county of the same name (and, until 1974, part of the county of Lancashire) for it excludes settlements such as Wigan and Marple from Greater Manchester, but includes hinterland settlements which lie outside its statutory boundaries, such as Wilmslow in Cheshire, Glossop in Derbyshire, Whitworth in Lancashire and Newton-le-Willows in Merseyside.

Constituent parts

The largest settlements (in descending order of population) within the Greater Manchester Built-up Area are Manchester, Bolton, Stockport, Oldham, Rochdale, Salford, and Bury. These settlements are not coterminous with the Metropolitan Boroughs of the same name, and the ONS takes some of its settlement boundaries within the conurbation from the contiguous urban core of pre-Local Government Act 1972 local government districts. This means that the GMUA bears a much closer resemblance to the earlier "SELNEC" area than to the Greater Manchester Metropolitan County. Unlike most urban areas which expanded outwards around a central core of employment the Greater Manchester Urban Area was formed from the inward expansion of several large manufacturing towns towards a centralised marketplace for the trading of goods and raw materials.

Wigan is separate from the Greater Manchester Built-up Area, although eastern parts of the wider Metropolitan Borough of Wigan, such as Leigh, Tyldesley and Atherton are included. Wigan and Ince-in-Makerfield are included in a separate Wigan Urban Area, which includes places outside Greater Manchester.  The gap is formed between Ince-in-Makerfield (of Wigan Urban Area) and Hindley (Greater Manchester Urban Area).

Other built-up areas, including New Mills and the rest of High Peak are narrowly avoided as is Ashton-in-Makerfield, which is included in the Liverpool Urban Area, and much of the parish of Saddleworth.

Settlements

According to the ONS definitions the Greater Manchester Built-up Area consists of the following settlements:

Notes:

See also
Geography of Greater Manchester
List of Greater Manchester settlements by population

References

External links
Map showing makeup of the conurbation according to the ONS (PDF)

Geography of Greater Manchester
Urban areas of England